John Savage was an 18th-century surveyor of colonial Virginia. He surveyed as part of a 1736 expedition to settle a boundary dispute between Lord Fairfax and the English Privy Council concerning the extent of the vast Northern Neck land grant.

Surveying the Northern Neck
In 1736, three different survey expeditions were organized with all three having representatives of both the Colony of Virginia and of Lord Fairfax. One party was to explore and map the Potomac to its head; this included Major William Mayo and Mr Brookes for the Colony (and King) and Mr Winslow and John Savage for Fairfax. A second party was to explore and map the North Branch of the Rappahannock (Mr Wood, Mr Thomas, Jr) and the final party was to explore and map the South Branches (Rapidan and Conway Rivers) of the Rappahannock (Mr Graeme, Mr Thomas, Sr). All parties consisted of surveyors and commissioners and their works were completed in all three cases.

The work of the three groups and the county surveyors lead to the preparation of a map of the Northern Neck in 1736 and 1737. This map shows the courses of the Potomac and Rappahannock and cites latitudes across the map. What the map does not show, however, is a western boundary line for the grant. A line connecting the head springs of the Potomac with those of the Rappahannock had yet to be surveyed. This was to be the work of Colonel Peter Jefferson and Thomas Lewis — the "Fairfax Line" party — in 1746 and 1747, which finally settled the disputed claims.

Legacy
John Savage is the namesake of the Savage River in Maryland.

See also
Allegheny Mountains

References

Further reading

American surveyors
Virginia colonial people
People from Maryland
Year of birth missing
Year of death missing